Dian Fitriani (born 21 March 1993) is an Indonesian badminton player, affiliated with Pertamina Fastron. She competed in the junior event with Jaya Raya Jakarta club.

Achievements

BWF International Challenge/Series (1 title, 2 runners-up) 
Women's doubles

  BWF International Challenge tournament
  BWF International Series tournament
  BWF Future Series tournament

BWF Junior International (4 titles, 1 runner-up) 
Girls' doubles

  BWF Junior International Grand Prix tournament
  BWF Junior International Challenge tournament
  BWF Junior International Series tournament
  BWF Junior Future Series tournament

Performance timeline

Individual competitions 
 Senior level

References

External links 
 

1993 births
Living people
People from Magelang Regency
Sportspeople from Central Java
Indonesian female badminton players